Jessica Delfino (born June 8, 1976 in Bridgeport, Connecticut) is a controversial singer, songwriter, and comedian based in New York City. Her songs tend to ridicule taboos and typically include jokes about vaginas and other sexual or dark topics. In her act, she plays an assortment of instruments including guitar, flying V ukulele and a rape whistle. She is also an illustrator and attended Philadelphia's Art Institute, as well as the University of Maine. She has won numerous awards, including beating out Flight of the Conchords to win the Best Musical Act at the 2005 ECNY awards, and a 2005 Village Voice "Best of" Award, in which the Village Voice declared her to be "fall-off-your-chair hilarious."  She has appeared on Good Morning America as a finalist in a national comedy competition. She has also won many other competitions, some of them unusual, such as The Stoned Spelling Bee in Brooklyn, the Madagascar Institute's Catholic high
school talent competition and the Arlene's Grocery "Gong Show," which later became The Gong Show with Dave Attell on Comedy Central.

Music and Performance
Jessica Delfino's first CD, Dirty Folk Rock came out in 2004 on the Soundcakes International label.  It received excellent reviews all across the United States, including in Jane Magazine, High Times (Best "unsigned" Act of The Week), Arthur Magazine (in a fawning review by Sonic Youth's Thurston Moore) and The Onion (describing her as "Redd Foxx meets Jewel").

Delfino's second CD, I Wanna Be Famous, came out in June 2008 on the Loudmouth Records label, and was officially the first CD ever to be released by that label.  It has received praise from Time Out New York, Time Out London, and Blender Magazine's Rob Tannenbaum, who described Delfino as "The Joan Baez of the Vagina Song."  Animator Nick Fox-Gieg's video for the title cut of the song, I Wanna Be Famous, has been viewed more than one million times on YouTube.

She has appeared on Opie & Anthony's radio show, UK comedian Russell Brand's radio show, the Sundance Channel, BBC's Loose Ends Radio Programme, the Montreal Comedy Festival, the (Scotland) Edinburgh Fringe Festival, the Galway (Ireland) Comedy Festival, the Bud Light Comedy Festival (Dublin, Ireland), the NY International Children's Film Festival and toured the US with Lisa "Suckdog" Crystal Carver, Dame Darcy, The Trachtenburg Family Slideshow Players, and Corn Mo as their opening act. She has also appeared on the Fox News Channel show, "Red Eye" with Greg Gutfeld.

Delfino, together with Meat Cake author and fellow musician Dame Darcy created Naughty Nautical Nite, a monthly maritime-themed cabaret show at The Slipper Room in New York City, which showcases off-beat acts from around the world, such as ventriloquist Carla Rhodes and world-renowned thereminist Pamelia Kurstin.  In September 2008, she appeared in sold-out performances of her show, Dirty Folk Rock, at the Soho Theatre in London, for which she received a "Critics Choice" from Time Out London.

Delfino is also known for performing as various unusual characters, including "Bilge Baron" in her histrionic fear-metal band Haunted Pussy and "T-Top Trans-Am" (her white-trash burlesque act) amongst many others, some of which appear in "Skits N Tits" the monthly sketch comedy show she co-produces in NYC with Diane O'Debra Langan and Steph Sabelli.

New York Annual Funny Songs Festival
In June 2012, Jessica Delfino organized the First Annual Funny Songs Festival in New York City, "a four-day event that bills itself as the city’s first comedy music festival," featuring performers including Rob Paravonian, Jen Kwok, Ben Lerman, Soce the Elemental Wizard, Mindy Raf, Carolyn Castiglia, Myq Kaplan, Micah Sherman, and Jessica Delfino herself, among many others. The festival is scheduled to occur from Thursday, June 7, 2012, through Sunday, June 10, 2012, in Manhattan's Lower East Side neighborhood, and Delfino and the festival were the subjects of feature articles in The New York Times, Time Out New York, and numerous other publications.

Politics
Delfino managed the 2005 mayoral campaign of Christopher X. Brodeur, and she was featured in the 2009 documentary, The Promise of New York.

Writing
Delfino wrote for MTV's game show, I Bet You Will. Later, Morgan Spurlock hired her to write songs for his recent documentary film, What Would Jesus Buy?.

Delfino writes a blog that Wil Wheaton called "the funniest thing I've ever read." Her blog has since been moved to her website. She has also been a regular contributor for TNT's Saving Grace television series blog.

In 2016, Delfino wrote a weekly cannabis-themed Twitter round-up column for High Times called Toasted Tweets.

Through 2017–2020, she went on to write about parenting and cannabis for High Times and pen pieces about parenting for The Atlantic, Huffington Post, VH1, and The Week, and satire for McSweeney's Internet Tendencies, Working Mother, The New Yorker, and The New York Times.

She also was a contributor in the writer's room on Adult Swim's Mr. Punk Goes To Washington and for Bravo.

Controversy

On December 19, 2006, Catholic League president William A. Donohue publicly attacked Delfino's act, asserting that it "provides ammunition" to Muslim terrorists by "harboring a depraved understanding of liberty." In response, Delfino stated, "I was brought up Catholic, and I was also brought up to believe that it isn't anti-Catholic to celebrate the life-giving and life-nurturing parts of a woman’s body.  I don’t know why William Donohue hates women’s bodies.  I don’t know why he is afraid of refocusing attention on humanity's true source of creation, the mysterious and magical womb.  But I do know that William Donohue is a hypocrite and a bigot, who has publicly made outrageous and highly-offensive anti-Semitic, and now anti-Muslim statements.  And that certainly doesn't make him a better Catholic than I am.  William Donohue does not speak for all Catholics.  He doesn't speak for me."
 
On the day after Google announced its purchase of YouTube, YouTube removed a popular video of one of Delfino's songs, the subject of which was that her vagina was magic.  On October 11, 2008, that same video was featured as the top pick on playboy.com's "Video Hotlist," and was featured on the main front page of playboy.com's website.

Discography

Albums
Dirty Folk Rock, 2004
I Wanna Be Famous, 2008

Songs
"My Pussy Is Magic"
"I Wanna Be Famous"
"Jewish Boys"

References

External links
 Jessica Delfino official website
 Jessica Delfino Twitter account
 I Wanna Be Famous video
 Instagram account

1976 births
Living people
American comedy musicians
American women singer-songwriters
American folk singers
American multi-instrumentalists
American stand-up comedians
Musicians from Bridgeport, Connecticut
Singers from New York City
American ukulele players
American women comedians
21st-century American women guitarists
21st-century American guitarists
American people of Italian descent
Guitarists from Connecticut
Guitarists from New York City
21st-century American comedians
21st-century American women singers
21st-century American singers
Singer-songwriters from New York (state)
Singer-songwriters from Connecticut
Lincoln Academy (Maine) alumni